Ronaldo Pompeu da Silva (born 8 April 1990) is a Brazilian footballer who plays as a midfielder for Italian  club Vicenza.

Club career
In January 2016 Ronaldo was signed by Lazio. However, he was immediately left for sister club Salernitana. The loan was renewed on 31 August.

On 17 July 2019 he joined Serie C club Padova.

On 22 July 2022, Ronaldo signed a two-year contract with Vicenza.

References

External links 
 
 

1990 births
Living people
Sportspeople from Santa Catarina (state)
Brazilian footballers
Association football midfielders
Serie A players
Serie B players
Serie C players
Mantova 1911 players
Calcio Padova players
F.C. Grosseto S.S.D. players
Empoli F.C. players
U.S. Catanzaro 1929 players
F.C. Pro Vercelli 1892 players
S.S. Lazio players
U.S. Salernitana 1919 players
Novara F.C. players
L.R. Vicenza players
Brazilian expatriate footballers
Brazilian expatriate sportspeople in Italy
Expatriate footballers in Italy